Popovichi is a rural locality (a village) in Posyolok Anopino, Gus-Khrustalny District, Vladimir Oblast, Russia. The population was 1 as of 2010. There is 1 street.

Geography 
Popovichi is located 18 km north of Gus-Khrustalny (the district's administrative centre) by road. Vashutino is the nearest rural locality.

References 

Rural localities in Gus-Khrustalny District
Sudogodsky Uyezd